Nadole  is a village in the administrative district of Gmina Gniewino, within Wejherowo County, Pomeranian Voivodeship, in northern Poland.
There are in this village the Peasant and Fisherman's Farmsteads.
For details of the history of the region, see History of Pomerania.
 
The village has a population of 205.

Nadole was going to be the seat of Żarnowiec Nuclear Power Plant, which was never finished.

References 

Nadole